The A38 is a major arterial route in Sydney, Australia, connecting M2 Hills Motorway in  to the Pittwater Road (A8) in .

The name "A38" is just the route allocation. In fact it is made up of series of roads which, from west to east, are:
 Delhi Road
 Millwood Avenue
 Fullers Road
 Pacific Highway
 Boundary Street
 Babbage Road
 Warringah Road

The A38 also has a few notable bridges. They are Fullers Bridge and Roseville Bridge. The Fullers Bridge was built in 1918 while the Roseville Bridge was a newer bridge which replaced an older one in 1966.

History
The passing of the Main Roads Act of 1924 through the Parliament of New South Wales provided for the declaration of Main Roads, roads partially funded by the State government through the Main Roads Board (later the Department of Main Roads, and eventually Transport for NSW). Main Road No. 191 was declared along this road on 8 August 1928, from Ryde to the intersection with Great Northern Highway (today Pacific Highway at Chatswood).

The route was allocated part of State Route 29 in 1974. The Metroad 2 designation along Epping Road was decommissioned when M2 Hills Motorway opened in 1997: State Route 29 was extended west along Epping Road to terminate at Lane Cove Road (then Metroad 3, now A3). With the conversion to the newer alphanumeric system in 2013, this was replaced with route A38, and truncated back to the M2.

An underpass along Warringah Road was constructed in the Frenchs Forest area as part of the Northern Beaches Hospital Road Connectivity and Network Enhancement Project (Stage 2). The underpass opened to traffic on 28 March 2020. It allows Warringah Road traffic to bypass three sets of traffic lights at Forest Way, Hilmer Street and Wakehurst Parkway. Upgrades along Wakehurst Parkway would also help to connect the A38 to the proposed Western Harbour Tunnel & Beaches Link.

See also

References

Highways in New South Wales